Vlasovka is a rural locality (a selo) in Bolshealabukhskoye Rural Settlement, Gribanovsky District, Voronezh Oblast, Russia. The population was 147 as of 2010. There are 3 streets.

Geography 
Vlasovka is located 36 km northeast of Gribanovsky (the district's administrative centre) by road. Bolshiye Alabukhi is the nearest rural locality.

References 

Rural localities in Gribanovsky District